Carlo Lombardi may refer to:

 Carlo Francis Lombardi (1897–1983), World War One ace and founder of the AVIA aviation company
 Carlo Lombardi (Unionist soldier) (1834–1865), Italian patriot and soldier; fought in the Risorgimento and the American Civil War
 Carlo Lombardi (architect) (1559–1620), Italian architect of the Renaissance period
 Carlo Lombardi (actor) in The Giant of Marathon, Luce nelle tenebre etc.
 Carlo Lombardi (politician), see Legislature III of Italy